Dragon Fountain may refer to:
Fountains
 Dragon Fountain, Copenhagen, a fountain in Copenhagen, Denmark
 Dragon Fountain, a fountain in Schleiz, Germany

Other
 Longquan, a Chinese city whose name means "Dragon Fountain"